Bumble is an online dating service.

Bumble may also refer to:

 Bumble (TV series), a New Zealand children's show
 Oliver B. Bumble, a fictional bear in a series of Dutch comic books by Marten Toonder
 David Lloyd (cricketer) (born 1947), nicknamed Bumble
 Mr. Bumble, a fictional character in Charles Dickens' novel Oliver Twist
 Mr. Bumble, a fictional character in the film Mr. Bug Goes to Town 
 "Bumble" or The Abominable Snowman, a fictional monster and the main antagonist in the 1964 TV special Rudolph the Red-Nosed Reindeer
 Bumble, a fictional bee in the British children's TV series Fifi and the Flowertots
 Bumble, a cat-lemur fairy from the video game Kinectimals
 Bumble bee, any bee of the genus Bombus
 Bumble tree may refer to Australian fruiting trees in the caper family:
 Capparis loranthifolia
 Capparis mitchellii
 Bumble and bumble, a hair products brand

See also 
 The Bumblies, a UK children's TV programme created by Michael Bentine
 Bumblebee (disambiguation)